The League of Armenian Social Democrats (abbreviated ՀՍԴՄ, HSDM) was the first Armenian Iskraist social democratic organization.

History
The League of Armenian Social Democrats was founded in Tiflis in 1902 by Stepan Shahumyan, Melik Melikian, Achot Khoumerian, Assadour Kakhoyan, B. Knunyantsi and Arshak Zubarian. In October 1902, it published its manifesto, which adhered to proletarian internationalism. Lenin hailed the positions of HSDM on the national question, but criticized its federalist demands. HSDM published the newspaper Proletaryat. In March 1903, HSDM merged into the Caucasus Organization of the Russian Social Democratic Labour Party.

See also

 History of Armenia
 Politics of Armenia

References

1902 establishments in the Russian Empire
1903 disestablishments in the Russian Empire
Defunct political parties in Armenia
Defunct socialist parties in Asia
Defunct socialist parties in Europe
Marxist parties in Armenia
Political parties disestablished in 1903
Political parties established in 1902
Political parties of minorities in Imperial Russia
Russian Social Democratic Labour Party
Socialist parties in Armenia